Llovizna Falls is a waterfall on the Caroní River, close to its confluence with the Orinoco, are located in the Llovizna Park, Puerto Ordaz, Venezuela. The nearby Macagua Dam has reduced the flow over the waterfall in recent years, but the cascade continues to be spectacular and returns to its former glory several times a year when the floodgates of the dam are opened.

(Llovizna - "yoviz-nah", is Spanish for mist, drizzle, spray).

Activities
The Llovizna Park is very big, and it has many green areas and benches where family and friends can spend a good time. In the stone theater, located close to the entrance of the park, visitors can enjoy the different shows and plays that locals do to entertain the community and raise the visits of the park. 
Family and friends can also do a picnic. The park has one restaurant that sells the typical plates from the state such as, Arepas, Empanada, Tequeño, and many other things. 
Exercise and training are other activities you can do in the park. The park offers very wide and safe walkaways used by people to ride bicycles, run, jog, or just walk. There are also training machines that are free for visitors.
For the tourists, the park offers a bus tour that takes the visitors to the most special spots of the park such as the Stone Theater, the waterfall, the iron bridge, and many other places.

Recommendations for Visitors
It is recommended to wear sports shoes and clothes that would make you feel comfortable in the hot temperature and humidity of the park. There are many rocks and bridges so go prepared for this. Beware of the snakes, do not leave children alone, and check out the places where you stop by. Venezuela is a country with no seasons other than wet and dry
, so visitors can go to the park any time of the year.

Biodiversity of the Park
The park is full of life. Many species live there. The most common animals in the park are the Tufted capuchin, these monkeys usually interact with the park visitors and act very friendly with children. The park is also home to a big variety of spiders such as, Tarantula, Psalmopoeus irminia, and Epicadus. The park also has a big variety of snakes. The most abundant snake is the Anaconda. Other than spiders and snakes, there are not many other dangerous species in the park. 
The biodiversity of the park is because two rivers past through it, one of them is the second-longest river in South America, the Orinoco.

The park is located in the Guayana natural region.

Stories and folklores of the Park

The Tragedy of the Teachers
In August 1964, a tragedy happened in the park. The iron chain bridge used to be a wood chain bridge. A group of about 300 teachers from different states of the country met to celebrate the Teachers Convention and they were all excited to see the bridge that has a view to the waterfalls and the Caroní River. When the teachers started to cross the bridge, the bridge could not resist it and it broke. The teachers fell down the rocky river and many of them died because of the many rocks that the river has. Around 50 people died and some of the bodies have not been found yet.

The Girl Eaten by an Anaconda
This is the folklore of the park. The people from the city of Ciudad Guayana tell a story of a little girl who was sitting under a tree and an Anaconda that was hanging in the tree ate her. Even though this story is fake, it has made people be more careful with their children. However, there have been Anaconda attacks in the park, and animal control works to keep these snakes out of the park.

References

External links
Venelogia, Llovizna Park -Park information
MiNube, Llovizna Park -Visitor's opinion
Llovizna and Cachamay parks -Pictures of Llovizna Falls
Trip Advisor, Ciudad Guayana -Advises for visitors

Waterfalls of Venezuela
Orinoco basin
Geography of Bolívar (state)